The 2018 West Virginia Mountaineers football team represented West Virginia University in the 2018 NCAA Division I FBS football season. The Mountaineers played their home games at the Mountaineer Field at Milan Puskar Stadium, in Morgantown, West Virginia, and compete in the Big 12 Conference. They were led by eighth-year head coach Dana Holgorsen.

Previous season
The Mountaineers finished the 2017 season 7–6, 5–4 in Big 12 play to finish in a four-way tie for fourth place. They were invited to the Heart of Dallas Bowl where they lost to Utah.

Preseason

First team All-Americans

Quarterback Will Grier and wide receiver David Sills were named to numerous preseason All-America teams by various media outlets.

Award watch lists
Listed in the order that they were released

Big 12 media poll
The Big 12 media poll was released on July 12, 2018 with the Mountaineers predicted to finish in second place.

Schedule

Schedule Source:

Coaching staff

Roster
Position key

Game summaries

vs. Tennessee

Statistics

Kansas State

Statistics

at Iowa State

Statistics

Baylor

Statistics

at Oklahoma State

Statistics

Oklahoma

Statistics

vs. Syracuse (Camping World Bowl)

Rankings

Players drafted into the NFL

References

West Virginia
West Virginia Mountaineers football seasons
West Virginia Mountaineers football